Love Is War is a 1970 Norwegian drama film directed by Ragnar Lasse-Henriksen. It was entered into the 21st Berlin International Film Festival where it won a Silver Bear for an outstanding single achievement.

Cast
 Yvonne Ingdal as Gro
 Ole-Jørgen Nilsen as Espen
 Per Oscarsson as Mann med ønskekvist
 Jarl Strømsborg as Espen as a kid
 Vibeke Løkkeberg as Espen's mother
 Tor Stokke as Espen's father
 Majken Kruse as Naked girl in the window
 Bonne Gauguin as Gros mor
 Per Tofte as Fiolinisten
 Alf Malland as Doctor

References

External links

1970 films
1970s Norwegian-language films
1970 drama films
Norwegian drama films